The inline speed skating events at the 2001 World Games in Akita was played between 24 and 26 August. 41 roller skaters, from 11 nations, participated in the tournament. The competition took place at Akita Prefectural Skating Rink.

Participating nations

Medal table

Events

Men

Women

References

External links
 World Skate
 Roller sports on IWGA website
 Results

 
2001 World Games
2001